Aspasmogaster is a genus of clingfishes native to the Indian and Pacific Oceans.

Species
There are currently four recognized species in this genus:
 Aspasmogaster costata (J. D. Ogilby, 1885) (Eastern clingfish)
 Aspasmogaster liorhyncha Briggs, 1955 (Smooth-snout clingfish)
 Aspasmogaster occidentalis Hutchins, 1984
 Aspasmogaster tasmaniensis (Günther, 1861) (Tasmanian clingfish)

References

 
Gobiesocidae